Linnea Hall is a building located in northwest Portland, Oregon, in the United States. It is listed on the National Register of Historic Places.

See also
 National Register of Historic Places listings in Northwest Portland, Oregon

References

1909 establishments in Oregon
Buildings and structures completed in 1909
National Register of Historic Places in Portland, Oregon
Northwest Portland, Oregon
Swedish-American culture in Oregon
Portland Historic Landmarks